It's About Time is the fifty-third studio album by Hank Williams Jr. released by Nash Icon Records on January 15, 2016. The album includes re-recordings of previously released material and new songs.

Reception

Critical response

Billboard felt that the album's lyrics sent a mixed message, writing, "On the title track of his new album, It's About Time, billed as his 37th, he complains he has 'had enough of this weird pop-country sound.' But that doesn't stop him from recruiting contemporary country talents and tricks for help." Rolling Stone panned the album, writing "Country vet rocks out, waves guns around, incites snoozes". Allmusic gave the album 4 out of 5, writing "there's not a sense of a bro-country sop because this has swagger and, as the man himself says at the song's end, 'the band played like they were pissed.' All through It's About Time, Hank Jr. and his colleagues play it big and burly, laying into barroom boogies and rocking country as if they never went out of style. Williams knows this isn't true, of course. He notes that 'Those Days Are Gone' -- itself an ode to the days when you could hear Haggard, Coe, and Jones on the radio -- but he sings this ode to olden days without a tear in his eye, possibly because he's having too much fun once again raising a ruckus."

Commercial performance
The album debuted at No. 2 on Top Country Albums, the highest he's reached on the chart since the release of Lone Wolf in 1990. The album also debuted at No. 15 on the Billboard 200, selling 24,000 copies in its first week. It sold a further 9,000 copies in its second week.  The album has sold 60,800 copies in the US as of March 2016.

Track listing

Personnel

Robert Bailey - background vocals
Tom Bukovac - acoustic guitar, electric guitar
Eric Church - duet vocals on "Are You Ready for the Country"
J.T. Corenflos - electric guitar
Glen Duncan - fiddle
Kim Fleming - background vocals
Paul Franklin - steel guitar
Brantley Gilbert - vocals on "Born to Boogie"
Jimmy Hall - harmonica
Vicki Hampton - background vocals
Mark Hill - bass guitar
Victor Indrizzo - drums
Chris Janson - harmonica, background vocals
Kim Keyes - background vocals
Tim Lauer - keyboards, piano
Aaron Lewis - background vocals
Regina McCrary - background vocals
Justin Moore - vocals on "Born to Boogie"
Brad Paisley - electric guitar solo and vocals on "Born to Boogie"
Deborah Person - background vocals
Jimmie Lee Sloas - bass guitar
Tara Thompson - background vocals
Ilya Toshinsky - banjo, acoustic guitar
Hank Williams Jr. - lead vocals

Charts

Weekly charts

Year-end charts

References

2016 albums
Big Machine Records albums
Hank Williams Jr. albums
Albums produced by Julian Raymond